Hans Erik Ramberg (born August 8, 1976) is a Norwegian former footballer.

As a youngster, he was considered to be one of the greatest talents in Norway. He signed for AFC Ajax at a very young age. However, an injury made him unable to continue his career. He chose to retire as a football player, and instead work as a teacher. But he was not to fully give up his career; Before the 2005 Tippeligaen season he was once again playing football, and joined Fredrikstad.

He retired after the 2013 season.

Career statistics

References

External links
 Guardian Football
Fredrikstadfk.no's player profile
 Player profile at ffksupporter.net (in Norwegian)

1976 births
Living people
Norwegian footballers
Fredrikstad FK players
AFC Ajax players
Moss FK players
Norwegian First Division players
Eliteserien players
Sportspeople from Fredrikstad

Association football midfielders